Kunnathur is the only Scheduled Caste reserved legislative assembly constituency in Kollam district of Kerala, India. It is one among the 11 assembly constituencies in the district. As of the 2021 assembly elections, the current MLA is Kovoor Kunjumon of RSP(L).

Structure
As per the recent changes on assembly constituency delimitations, the Kunnathur assembly constituency consists of East Kallada, Munroe Island, Kunnathur, Mynagappally, Poruvazhy, Sasthamcotta, Sooranad North, Sooranad South, West Kallada, Pavithreswaram Panchayats in Kollam district.

Electoral history
The Kunnathur constituency was a two-member constituency till 1965. It officially became an SC reserved constituency since Kerala State Assembly Election 1967.

Travancore-Cochin Legislative Assembly Elections

Members of Legislative Assembly 
The following list contains all members of Kerala legislative assembly who have represented the constituency:

Key

Election results 
Percentage change (±%) denotes the change in the number of votes from the immediate previous election.

Niyamasabha Election 2016 
There were 2,08,541 registered voters in the constituency for the 2016 Kerala Niyamasabha Election.

Niyamasabha Election 2011 
There were 1,94,463 registered voters in the constituency for the 2011 election.

References

Assembly constituencies of Kerala
Government of Kollam
Politics of Kollam district
Assembly constituencies in Kollam district
1957 establishments in Kerala
Constituencies established in 1957